Chris Antoine Elogne Kablan (born 30 November 1994) is a Swiss professional footballer who plays for Lausanne-Sport as a left back.

Professional career
Kablan made his professional debut for Thun  in a 1–2 Swiss Super League loss to FC Zürich on 30 July 2017.

On 17 June 2021, Kablan signed with recently relegated Belgian First Division B club Waasland-Beveren. The move reunited him with his former Thun coach Marc Schneider.

On 24 January 2023, Kablan returned to Switzerland and signed with Lausanne-Sport.

Personal life
Kablan was born in Switzerland to an Ivorian father and a Swiss mother. He also holds French citizenship.

References

7. https://www.24heures.ch/le-lausanne-sport-engage-le-defenseur-chris-kablan-119056776690

External links
 Sport.De profile
 
 Thun Profile
 SFL Profile

1994 births
Sportspeople from Lucerne
Swiss people of Ivorian descent
French sportspeople of Ivorian descent
Living people
Swiss men's footballers
Association football defenders
FC Luzern players
SC Kriens players
FC Thun players
S.K. Beveren players
Real Salt Lake players
Real Monarchs players
FC Lausanne-Sport players
Swiss 1. Liga (football) players
Swiss Promotion League players
Swiss Super League players
Swiss Challenge League players
Challenger Pro League players
Major League Soccer players
MLS Next Pro players
Swiss expatriate footballers
Expatriate footballers in Belgium
Swiss expatriate sportspeople in Belgium
Expatriate soccer players in the United States
Swiss expatriate sportspeople in the United States